New York held various elections in 2009.

Federal

20th congressional district special election

Kirsten Gillibrand was appointed to the United States Senate, replacing Hillary Clinton, who resigned to become United States Secretary of State. A special election was held to fill her House seat on March 31, with Republican James Tedisco and Democrat Scott Murphy the two candidates. After the two finished in a near tie on election night, absentee ballots turned up a 700-vote margin for Murphy, despite the ballots being sent out to far more Republicans than Democrats. Murphy won the seat.

23rd congressional district special election

John M. McHugh was nominated to become United States Secretary of the Army, necessitating a special election to fill his seat. Democratic candidate Bill Owens won the special election on November 3, 2009 defeating the Conservative candidate Doug Hoffman and the Republican candidate Dierdre Scozzafava, which as a result, marks the first time that a Democrat represented parts of this district since the Civil War.

State 
There were no statewide elections in 2009.

Cities

Albany

Albany Mayor Gerald Jennings is expected to run for reelection. However he will likely face a very competitive primary. Councilman Corey Ellis, President of the Common Council Shawn Morris and Reverend Valerie Faust will run against Mayor Jennings.

Buffalo

Democratic incumbent Buffalo Mayor Byron Brown was re-elected to a second term, defeating Councilmember Michael P. Kearns.

New York City

New York City Mayor Mike Bloomberg won a third term as mayor. There were also citywide races for Public Advocate, and Comptroller.

Rochester

Democratic incumbent Robert Duffy ran unopposed for mayor and was re-elected for a second term.

Syracuse

Democratic incumbent Matt Driscoll was term limited. Democrat Stephanie Miner defeated Republican Steve Kimatian and became Syracuse's first female mayor.

References

 
2009
New York